Štefan Holý (born 11 December 1978 in Nová Baňa) is a Slovak politician who has served since 2020 as a  Deputy Prime Minister of Slovakia is charge of Legislation & Strategic Planning.  He is a member of the We Are Family party.

References 

Living people
1978 births
People from Nová Baňa